Yann Cunha (born 22 January 1991) is a Brazilian racing driver.

Career

Karting
Yann Cunha began his career kart racing. In November 2010 Yann, teamed up with pilots Luiz Cordeiro and Lu Boesel, won the famous 500 miles kart race in Granja Viana, São Paulo, where celebrities such as Nelson Piquet Jr. and Rubens Barrichello participated as well.

Formula Three Sudamericana
In 2008 he began competing in the fastest category of the continent, the South American Formula 3.

In his first season, Yann participated in only a few races, and started preparing for the 2009 season. 2009 was his first full year of racing.
At 18, he worked with the team Razia Sports to develop the new Dallara F309, which now equips the cars of that class. Yann placed second in the opening round of the competition, held in Brasília. Yann raced a variety of circuits in 2009, he raced in his home town of Brasília but also the circuits of Curitiba, Rio de Janeiro, Santa Cruz do Sul, Buenos Aires (Argentina), Piriápolis (Uruguay), São Paulo and Campo Grande. Yann appeared on the podium for these races and was confirmed the best rookie in Formula 3.

Racing record

Career summary

Complete Auto GP World Series results
(key)

Complete Formula Renault 3.5 Series results
(key) (Races in bold indicate pole position) (Races in italics indicate fastest lap)

References

External links
 
 
 Globo Esporte - Granja Viana 2010 500 miles kart race

1991 births
Living people
Brazilian racing drivers
Formula 3 Sudamericana drivers
British Formula Renault 2.0 drivers
British Formula Three Championship drivers
Euroformula Open Championship drivers
Sportspeople from Brasília
Auto GP drivers
World Series Formula V8 3.5 drivers

T-Sport drivers
Pons Racing drivers
AV Formula drivers
CRS Racing drivers
Manor Motorsport drivers
Ombra Racing drivers